There are 764 nature reserves in the state of Lower Saxony in north Germany, covering a total area of  as at 31 December 2008.

In addition, there are two national parks and one biosphere reserve that are also under strict protection and which raise the area coverage to 11.32%.

The table below shows a selection of these reserves. Where a nature reserve extends over several rural (Landkreise) or urban districts (Kreisfreie Städte) these are given in order of the size area covered. By sorting on the column "Rural/Urban District" the reserves that are found wholly or partially within a district can be seen at a glance. In order to locate the other areas, use the search function of your computer keyboard  (CTRL / Ctrl + F).

The NSG Nos. (i.e. nature reserve numbers) are based on the former provinces (Regierungsbezirken) (BR = Brunswick, HA = Hanover, LÜ = Lüneburg, WE = Weser-Ems).

References

Sources 

 Ulrich Sippel: Stand der Ausweisung von Naturschutzgebieten in Niedersachsen. Hannover 2005, 127 pages. Aus Informationsdienst Naturschutz Niedersachsen ISSN 0934-7135. Niedersächsischer Landesbetrieb für Wasserwirtschaft, Küsten- und Naturschutz (NLWKN)

External links 

 The Nature Reserves of Lower Saxony (Niedersächsischer Landesbetrieb für Wasserwirtschaft, Küsten- und Naturschutz = NLWKN) 
 New Nature Reserves in Lower Saxony from 1.1.2009 (NLWKN)